Francisco Humberto Vélez Montiel (born March 30, 1955) is a Mexican actor who is most widely known for dubbing the voice of Homer Simpson for the first 15 seasons of the Latin American dub of The Simpsons. In 2005, the dub voice cast of The Simpsons were replaced following a labor dispute. In 2021, Velez returns to The Simpsons as the official voice actor for Homer, alongside some members of the original cast for Season 32.

Voice acting career

Animation
Samwise Gamgee in the Latin American dub of The Return of the King (1980 film)
Homero Simpson in the Latin American dub of The Simpsons. (Season 1 to Season 15, Season 32.)
Peter Griffin in Family Guy (seasons 1-2)
Professor Hubert Farnsworth and Kif Kroker in Futurama (seasons 1-4)
Malfus the Philosopher in Disenchantment 
Tarantulas in the Latin American dub of Beast Wars
Winnie the Pooh (second voice)
Lord Farquaad in Shrek
Roz in Monsters, Inc.
Yokai/Professor Robert Callaghan in Big Hero 6
John Silver in Treasure Planet
 P.T. Flea in A Bug's Life
 Verne in Over the Hedge
Hondo Ohnaka in Star Wars: The Clone Wars
Ben and Sir Robert Norramby in Thomas the Tank Engine and Friends
Poncho Balón in Poncho Balón
Huevay II in Una Película de Huevos and Otra Película de Huevos y un Pollo
El Padrino in Un gallo con muchos huevos
El General in Marcianos vs. Mexicanos
Pierre in Kitty Is Not a Cat

Live action
Al Bundy in the Latin American dub of Married... with Children
Dick Solomon in 3rd Rock from the Sun
Ernest "Ernie" Smuntz in Mouse Hunt
Snowbell in Stuart Little, Stuart Little 2, Stuart Little 3 and Stuart Little: The Animated Series
Dr. Peter Burns in Melrose Place
CSM-101 (regular voice; Alejandro Illescas as his understudy) in Terminator 2: El Juicio Final
"Pool Cue" in Terminator 2: El Juicio Final
Tony Soprano in The Sopranos
Harry Wormwood and the Narrator in Matilda (the two roles were also portrayed by a single actor, Danny DeVito, in the original English version)

Video games
Lee Sin in League of Legends
Call Of Duty Vanguard

References

External links

1955 births
Living people
People from Orizaba
Mexican male voice actors
20th-century Mexican male actors
21st-century Mexican male actors
Mexican voice directors
Male actors from Veracruz